Pedi may refer to:

Places
 Pedi, Peren, a village in Nagaland, India

People
 Tom Pedi, 20th century American actor
 Christine Pedi, American television and theatre actress

Culture
Pedi people
Northern Sotho language, or the dialect of it spoken by the Pedi people

Prefixes and related abbreviations
Pedi-, with various roots and meanings pertaining to children, feet, and soil
Pediatrics, sometimes abbreviated "pedi"
Pedicab, sometimes abbreviated "pedi"
Pedicure, sometimes abbreviated "pedi"

Other uses
Pedi (sheep)

Language and nationality disambiguation pages